On 19 June 2020, P. Jeyaraj (59 years old) and his son J. Beniks (also spelled Fennix, Bennix) (31 years old) were picked up for inquiry by the Tamil Nadu Police in Sathankulam, Thoothukudi district for allegedly violating the Indian government's COVID-19 lockdown rules. According to the police, the duo was held for allegedly keeping their mobile accessories shop open beyond permissible hours on June 19. An FIR was filed against the two on 19 June and both were taken into custody. However CBI in chargesheet claimed there were no violation of the lockdown rules. They were sexually assaulted and tortured by the police while in custody, leading to their deaths. On 22 June 2020, Beniks fell ill and was moved to the Kovilpatti General Hospital, where he died later that day. The following day, 22 June 2020, his father also died. The custodial death of the two men in Tamil Nadu's Sathankulam town in Thoothukudi district sparked massive outrage in the state over police brutality.

Timeline of events
On 19 June 2020, according to multiple eyewitnesses, the Sathankulam police had picked up  on Jeyaraj and taken him to the police station to conduct an inquiry about an argument that had allegedly taken place between the police and a few others near Jeyaraj's wood workshop the previous day.

On 19 June 2020, around 7:30 pm, Beniks was in his shop near the Kamarajar statue in Sathankulam town when his friend rushed to him with the news that his father Jeyaraj had been picked up by the police. Worried about his father, Beniks and the friend rushed to the Sathankulam police station. Beniks was called in by the police while he was waiting outside. When he went in to question why his father had been taken to the station, he was allegedly assaulted. Soon, friends of Beniks, who are lawyers, gathered outside the police station. According to Beniks's friends, they heard the police shout " How you dare speak against the police". Eyewitness say that violence inside the police station escalated when Sub-Inspector Raghu Ganesh arrived. Police volunteers present inside the station also allegedly started assaulting the duo. Lawyers were not allowed to meet Beniks or his father until 20 June.
On 20 June 2020, according to the duo's lawyer Maniraman, they had to change as many as six lungis due to the profuse bleeding from their rectums. The police took Jeyaraj and Beniks to Kovilpatti Hospital for medical fitness testing. The medical fitness certificate was provided by Doctor Vennila. After that, they were taken to Sathankulam Magistrate D Saravanan, who remanded the injured duo in custody without examining their physical condition. D.Saravanan came out and stood at the balcony of his house when the team of police were standing around Jayaraj and Beniks at the entrance. Without following the protocol to examine, D.Saravanan waved his hands to the police to take them away. D.Saravanan was complacent in his duty and took the side of the police in a casual way.
On 22 June 2020, while Beniks was undergoing treatment at Government Hospital, Kovilpatti, he died at 9:00 pm, due to heavy internal bleeding. P. Jeyaraj was admitted at Government Hospital, Kovilpatti by the authorities of Sub Jail, Kovilpatti on the same day at 10:30 pm.
On 23 June 2020, at 5:40 am, P. Jeyaraj died due to a punctured lung while undergoing treatment.

High Court and Human Rights Commission
The Madurai bench of Madras High Court took suo motu cognizance of the matter and on 24 June, a bench consisting of Justices P.N. Prakash and B. Pugalendhi ordered the Superintendent of Police, Thoothukudi, to inquire into the incident and submit a status report. An order was given to videograph the autopsy, which the court ordered to be done by a panel of three experts in the presence of a magistrate after the police completed its inquest proceedings. Copies of both reports of the autopsy and inquest were submitted to the high court. State Human Rights Commission Tamil Nadu has taken suo motu cognizance of the offence and asked the Police Department to file a reply in this regard.

Judicial inquiry

During the pendency of the autopsy inquiry, Magistrate M S Bharathidasan submitted a report to the High Court describing rude behaviour by Constable Maharajan at the Sathankulam police station. In the report, the Magistrate said Constable Maharajan made a “very disparaging remark” against him in the presence of D Kumar, Additional Superintendent of Police and C Prathapan, Deputy Superintendent of Police, even as policemen at the station recorded the videos of the proceeding.

Following the complaint, the Madurai Bench of Madras High Court began a suo motu contempt of court proceeding and ordered the Inspector General of Police for the South Zone to take action against the officers. The Inspector General suspended Maharajan; D Kumar, ADSP, and C Prathapan, DSP was moved to a waiting list. The High Court also directed the Thoothukudi district collector to depute revenue officials and take control of the police station to enable the magistrate to collect the necessary documents. This incident represents the first time in the history of Indian Police that a district administration had seized control of a police station. The judges further directed the Additional Director of Forensic Sciences department to send a team of experts to collect materials from the station.

Reaction on social media 

Celebrities, politicians, and several notable people used social media to reveal the details of the attack and condemn the police action. Hundreds of thousands of tweets were sent out using the hashtag "#JusticeforJayarajandBennix", which was among the top Twitter topics trending in India on 26 June 2020 and among the top 30 trending globally. Celebrities, including Ravichandran Ashwin, Shikhar Dhawan, Suchitra, Siddharth, Khushbu, Jayam Ravi, Karthik Subbaraj, D. Imman, Suriya used the hashtag. Jignesh Mevani, a social activist and lawyer from Gujarat in western India, wrote on Twitter that "The George Floyd of India are far too many". Film director Hari issued a statement condemning police brutality and expressing regret for glorifying policemen in five of his films.

Official response

The Police Department had suspended two sub inspectors and an inspector. The entire team in the Sathankulam police station, including those in other ranks, have been transferred to other locations. Kanimozhi, Member of Parliament, Lok Sabha for the Thoothukudi Constituency said the incident was a collective failure of police and other officials and a gross violation of human rights. On 28 June, The Tamil Nadu Chief Minister Edappadi K Palaniswami has directed the probe into the deaths be handed over to the CBI.

CBI Investigation 
Central Bureau of Investigation had registered two cases on 7 July 2020 related to the allegations of custodial death. On the request of Tamil Nadu Government & further notification from Govt of India, and taken over the investigation of both the cases, earlier registered vide Crime no. 649 & 650 at Police Station Kovilpatti. A CBI team camped continuously at Madurai and worked in the case during COVID-19 pandemic. During the investigation 10 police officials including Inspector/SHO, 3 Sub inspector, 2 HC, 4 Constables, all of Sathankulam Police Station were arrested. The CBI had filed a chargesheet on 26.09.2020 against all  arrested police officials U/s 120-B of IPC r/w sections 302, 342, 201, 182, 193, 211, 218 & 34 & substantive offences. One more accused, Sub Inspector Palthurai died during investigation due to  COVID-19.

According to the CBI chargesheet, the post-mortem report established that the police officers brutally tortured Jeyaraj and Beniks, and “had inflicted several injuries knowing well that they would die of such injuries.” The CBI report titled "Results of Laboratory Analysis," states that the DNA samples collected from the walls of the Sathankulam lockup, toilet, room of SHO and from the lathis were a match to the samples of the two victims.

The chargesheet added that both Jeyaraj and Beniks were tortured inside the police station between 7:45 pm on June 9 and 3 am the next day. As per the CBI investigation, they were subjected to several rounds of beatings. The chargesheet further said that whenever there was a silence, the inspector used to urge the staff by asking about reasons for silence and thereby instigating them to start fresh rounds of beating. Also clothes were removed to add to the brutality of torture. Process of brutal torture of the Beniks and his father continued for hours together within the closed premises of police station.
According to the report, Investigations revealed Jeyaraj was first picked up by Sub-Inspector Balakrishnan, Inspector S Sridhar, Police Constable M. Muthuraja and other officials from Kamarajar Chowk on the evening of 19 June at 7:30 pm and that Beniks, his son, upon hearing Jeyaraj had been arrested enquired the police upon which he was asked to come to the police station.

The charge sheet says, 'Beniks who upon reaching the police station saw his father Jeyaraj being beaten by the accused SI K. Balakrishnan. Beniks objected to that and question the SI about the reason for bringing his father to the police station and subjecting him to torture."

Soon after, an altercation ensued between Beniks and two officers PC M. Muthuraja and SI K. Balakrishnan as he had taken offence to Benik's questioning, and 'In a fit of rage, deceased Beniks was also wrongfully confined inside the police station,' There were 18 injuries found on the body of the deceased during Inquest Proceedings. The injuries so recorded in the Inquest Report include some serious injuries, big in size with peeled skin. Further, Final Post Mortem Report furnished by the team of 03 doctors established that the deceased Beniks died of complications of blunt injuries sustained.'

Aftermath 
On 8 July 2020, the Office of the Additional Chief Secretary issued an order disbanding the Friends of Police movement in the whole of Tamil Nadu. This reversed an earlier order issued in 1994, which extended the Friends of Police movement to the whole state of Tamil Nadu.

See also 
Police terrorism
List of cases of police brutality in India

References

Deaths in police custody in India
2020 deaths
Police misconduct in India
Police brutality in the 2020s
Rape in India
Rape of males
Prisoner abuse
Violence against men in Asia
Police brutality in India
Extrajudicial killings